In the Aeneid of Virgil, Abaris (Ancient Greek: Ἄβαρις) was a warrior of Turnus, the man who resisted the Trojan hero, Aeneas in Italy. He was killed by Euryalus,  in the battle between the Trojans and the Rutuli.

Mythology 

"Nor was the sword of fair Euryalus less fatal found; but fiercely raging on his path of death, he pressed on through a base and nameless throng, Rhoetus, Herbesus, Fadus, Abaris.."

Note

References 

Publius Vergilius Maro, Aeneid. Theodore C. Williams. trans. Boston. Houghton Mifflin Co. 1910. Online version at the Perseus Digital Library.
Publius Vergilius Maro, Bucolics, Aeneid, and Georgics. J. B. Greenough. Boston. Ginn & Co. 1900. Latin text available at the Perseus Digital Library.

Characters in the Aeneid